The Queensland Blades are a men's Australian field hockey team, representing Queensland in the Australian Hockey League.

The Blades have been the most successful team to play in recent years. Their home ground is the State Hockey Centre at Colmslie in Brisbane, Queensland.

They have also competed under the name Brisbane Baldes. And between the years 1993–2000, Queensland also provided a second team in the National Competition, the North Queensland Barras.

The team were champions in the 2007 AHL final played in Perth, Western Australia on 1 April 2007, beating the WA Thundersticks.

In 2010 the Queensland Blades defeated the New South Wales Waratahs in the AHL final to win the championship.

They have since also won the 2012, 2013 and 2015 editions.

Season standings

2017 squad

See also

References

External links
 Hockey Queensland
 https://web.archive.org/web/20071013151730/http://220.233.133.40/Default.aspx?tabid=220 
 http://220.233.133.40/Portals/0/2006/Hockey_in_Australia/files/Fact_Files/AHL_NHL%20Fact%20File.pdf

Australian field hockey clubs
Queensland representative sports teams
Sporting clubs in Brisbane